Kanawa was an  ("Kaibokan") of the Imperial Japanese Navy during the Second World War. After the war Kanawa was used in repatriation service. She was then taken by the British and scrapped in 1947 at Singapore.

References 

Ukuru-class escort ships
1945 ships